The basement membrane, also known as base membrane is a thin, pliable sheet-like type of extracellular matrix that provides cell and tissue support and acts as a platform for complex signalling. The basement membrane sits between epithelial tissues including mesothelium and endothelium, and  the underlying connective tissue.

Structure 

As seen with the electron microscope, the basement membrane is composed of two layers, the basal lamina and the reticular lamina. The underlying connective tissue attaches to the basal lamina  with collagen VII anchoring fibrils and fibrillin microfibrils.

The basal lamina layer can further be subdivided into two layers based on their visual appearance in electron microscopy. The lighter-colored layer closer to the epithelium is called the lamina lucida, while the denser-colored layer closer to the connective tissue is called the lamina densa. The electron-dense lamina densa layer is about 30–70 nanometers thick and consists of an underlying network of reticular collagen IV fibrils which average 30 nanometers in diameter and 0.1–2 micrometers in thickness and are coated with the heparan sulfate-rich proteoglycan perlecan. In addition to collagen, this supportive matrix contains intrinsic macromolecular components. The lamina  lucida layer is made up of laminin, integrins, entactins, and dystroglycans. Integrins are a key component of hemidesmosomes which serve to anchor the epithelium to the underlying basement membrane.

To represent the above in a visually organised manner, the basement membrane is organized as follows:
 Epithelial/mesothelial/endothelial tissue (outer)
 Basement membrane
 Basal lamina
 Lamina lucida
 laminin
 integrins (hemidesmosomes)
 nidogens
 dystroglycans
 Lamina densa
 collagen IV (coated with perlecan, rich in heparan sulfate)
 Attaching proteins (between the basal and reticular laminae)
 collagen VII (anchoring fibrils)
 fibrillin (microfibrils)
 Lamina reticularis
 collagen III (as reticular fibers)
 Connective tissue (Lamina propria)

Function 
The primary function of the basement membrane is to anchor down the epithelium to its loose connective tissue (the dermis or lamina propria) underneath. This is achieved by cell-matrix adhesions through substrate adhesion molecules (SAMs).

The basement membrane acts as a mechanical barrier, preventing malignant cells from invading the deeper tissues. Early stages of malignancy that are thus limited to the epithelial layer by the basement membrane are called carcinoma in situ.

The basement membrane is also essential for angiogenesis (development of new blood vessels). Basement membrane proteins have been found to accelerate differentiation of endothelial cells.

The most notable examples of basement membranes is the glomerular basement membrane of the kidney, by the fusion of the basal lamina from the endothelium of glomerular capillaries and the podocyte basal lamina, and between lung alveoli and pulmonary capillaries, by the fusion of the basal lamina of the lung alveoli and of the basal lamina of the lung capillaries, which is where oxygen and  diffusion occurs (gas exchange).

As of 2017, other roles for basement membrane include blood filtration and muscle homeostasis. Fractones may be a type of basement membrane, serving as a niche for stem cells.

Clinical significance

Some diseases result from a poorly functioning basement membrane. The cause can be genetic defects, injuries by the body's own immune system, or other mechanisms. Diseases involving basement membranes at multiple locations include:
 Genetic defects in the collagen fibers of the basement membrane, including Alport syndrome and Knobloch syndrome
 Autoimmune diseases targeting basement membranes. Non-collagenous domain basement membrane collagen type IV is autoantigen (target antigen) of autoantibodies in the autoimmune disease Goodpasture's syndrome.
 A group of diseases stemming from improper function of basement membrane zone are united under the name epidermolysis bullosa.

In histopathology, a thickened basement membrane indicates mainly systemic lupus erythematosus or dermatomyositis, but also possibly lichen sclerosus.

Origin
These are only found within diploblastic and homoscleromorphic sponge animals. The homoscleromorph were found to be sister to diploblasts in some studies, making the membrane originate once in the history of life. But more recent studies have disregarded diploblast-homoscleromorph group, so other sponges may have lost it (most probable) or the origin in the two groups may be separate.

See also

References

Further reading 
 

Angiology
Tissues (biology)
Histology